The Appomattox Historic District national historic district located at Appomattox, Appomattox County, Virginia. It contains 297 contributing buildings, 6 contributing structures, and 3 contributing objects in Appomattox.  It includes Courthouse Square, the commercial district surrounding the railroad tracks, the Appomattox depot (1923), and surrounding residential areas dating back to the 19th century. Notable buildings include the Appomattox Courthouse (1892), Appomattox County Jail (1895-1897), County Office Building (1940), Knickerbocker Hotel (1892), Bank of Appomattox (1906), Appomattox Middle School (1908), Appomattox Pentecostal Holiness Church (c. 1900), and "The Nebraska House" (1854, 1872, c. 1896).

The district was listed on the National Register of Historic Places in 2002.  It is two miles southwest of the Appomattox Court House National Historical Park.  Even though the park and the district share many of the same building names, for example, the court house and the jail, they are different buildings in different locations.

References

Georgian architecture in Virginia
Geography of Appomattox County, Virginia
National Historic Landmarks in Virginia
Historic districts on the National Register of Historic Places in Virginia
Tourist attractions in Appomattox County, Virginia
National Register of Historic Places in Appomattox County, Virginia